Jeanne Ann Flanagan (born May 8, 1957 in New Haven, Connecticut) is an American former competitive rower and Olympic gold medalist.

Olympic athlete
Flanagan competed at the 1979 World Rowing Championships as a member of the woman's coxed-eight crew and won a bronze medal. She qualified for the 1980 U.S. Olympic team but was unable to compete due to the U.S. Olympic Committee's boycott of the 1980 Summer Olympics in Moscow, Russia. She was one of 461 athletes to receive a Congressional Gold Medal instead. Four years later, she was a member of the American women's eights team that won the gold medal at the 1984 Summer Olympics in Los Angeles, California.

Personal life
Flanagan attended The Morgan School in Clinton, Connecticut for High School and Florida Institute of Technology.

References

1957 births
Living people
Rowers at the 1984 Summer Olympics
Olympic gold medalists for the United States in rowing
American female rowers
Medalists at the 1984 Summer Olympics
World Rowing Championships medalists for the United States
Congressional Gold Medal recipients
Florida Institute of Technology
The Morgan School alumni
21st-century American women